Kim In-Wan (born 13 February 1971) is a South Korean retired footballer and football coach. He is currently manager of Daejeon Citizen. On 5 December 2012, he was appointed manager of Daejeon Citizen.

References

External links 

1971 births
Living people
Association football midfielders
South Korean footballers
South Korean football managers
Jeonnam Dragons players
Seongnam FC players
Daejeon Hana Citizen FC managers
K League 1 players